The canton of Château-Thierry is an administrative division in northern France. After the French canton reorganisation which came into effect in March 2015, the canton consisted of the following 21 communes:
 
Belleau
Bézu-Saint-Germain
Blesmes
Bouresches
Brasles
Brécy
Château-Thierry
Chierry
Coincy
Épaux-Bézu
Épieds
Étampes-sur-Marne
Étrépilly
Fossoy
Gland
Grisolles
Mont-Saint-Père
Nesles-la-Montagne
Rocourt-Saint-Martin
Verdilly
Villeneuve-sur-Fère

Demographics

See also
Cantons of the Aisne department 
Communes of France

References

Cantons of Aisne